Justin Drew Tranter (born June 16, 1980) is an American songwriter, singer, and activist. Frequently co-writing with Julia Michaels, Tranter has written songs for artists such as Britney Spears, Gwen Stefani, Linkin Park, Kelly Clarkson, Sara Bareilles, Selena Gomez, Justin Bieber, DNCE, Citizen Queen, Kesha, Imagine Dragons, Fifth Harmony, 5 Seconds of Summer, Ariana Grande, Lady Gaga, RAYE, Bea Miller, Demi Lovato, Dua Lipa, Måneskin, and Fall Out Boy. From 2004 to 2014, Tranter was the lead singer of Semi Precious Weapons, a rock band based in New York. Since February 2017, they have been a board member of GLAAD, an organization that promotes LGBT acceptance in the entertainment and news industries. Tranter's songs have garnered over 50 million single sales and 40 billion streams on Spotify and YouTube .

Early life
Justin Drew Tranter was born and grew up in Hawthorn Woods. They have three older brothers. Tranter says that they experienced bullying during their youth, which caused them to be transferred from the Lake Zurich public high school to the Chicago Academy for the Arts after a semester. While studying musical theater at the Academy, they started the AIDS Benefit, an annual show run by students to raise awareness for HIV/AIDS. Tranter graduated in 1998. Following this, they studied at the Berklee College of Music in Boston. Along with songwriting, they also took classes in business management. While at Berklee, they founded Musicians with a Mission, a scholarship fund for LGBT youth education.

Musical career

2002–2004: Career beginnings
Tranter released their debut studio album Scratched in 2002 and followed it up with their second studio album Tear Me Together in 2004.

2004–2014: Semi Precious Weapons

In 2004, following the release of Tear Me Together, Tranter formed the band Semi Precious Weapons in New York with fellow Berklee graduates Cole Whittle, Dan Crean, and Aaron Lee Tasjan; Tasjan was later replaced by Stevy Pyne. The band's debut studio album We Love You was released in 2008 and the band subsequently opened for Lady Gaga on her Monster Ball Tour from 2009 to 2011. Semi Precious Weapons released two more albums, You Love You (2010) and Aviation (2014), before disbanding in 2014. While still part of Semi Precious Weapons, Tranter moved to Los Angeles and signed a publishing deal with Warner Chappell Music in 2012 to write songs for other artists.

2014–present: Focus on songwriting
After signing with Warner Chappell, Tranter began working with artists such as Justin Bieber, Selena Gomez, Hailee Steinfeld, Fifth Harmony, and Fall Out Boy. In December 2015, Tranter was named one of the "20 Biggest Breakouts of 2015" by Rolling Stone for their songwriting contributions to the pop charts of that year. Tranter frequently collaborates with Julia Michaels and multiple songs co-written by the pair have appeared on Billboard charts; two such tracks, Gomez's "Good for You" and Bieber's "Sorry", topped the Mainstream Top 40. Tranter and Michaels also teamed up to co-write Gwen Stefani's third solo studio album This Is What the Truth Feels Like (2016). Tranter has since written for artists ranging from Britney Spears and Demi Lovato to Imagine Dragons and Linkin Park.

Beginning in 2020, Tranter has worked on music for film and television. They were an executive producer and songwriter for the soundtracks to the Hulu film Happiest Season (2020), Billy Porter's directorial debut Anything's Possible, and the Netflix film Purple Hearts (both 2022). They also co-wrote the end title song for Billy Eichner's film Bros (2022), "Hindsight". In 2023, Tranter will be an executive producer and songwriter for the soundtracks to Larin Sullivan's film The Young King and the Paramount+ Grease prequel television series Grease: Rise of the Pink Ladies.

Advocacy

Tranter's activism began in high school at the Chicago Academy for the Arts, where they created the annual AIDS Benefit to raise awareness for HIV/AIDS. This was followed by Musicians with a Mission, a scholarship fund for LGBT youth education that Tranter founded while attending the Berklee College of Music.

Tranter flew to Orlando to help in the aftermath of the 2016 Pulse nightclub shooting. They also co-wrote and co-organized the release of the charity single "Hands" to raise funds for Equality Florida's Pulse Victims Fund, GLAAD, and the GLBT Community Center of Central Florida.

In February 2017, Tranter joined GLAAD's National Board of Directors. During the GLAAD Media Awards of that year, Tranter raised $123,000 for the organization by auctioning off four individual songwriting and recording sessions. Each year, Tranter hosts an in-person Spirit Day concert to raise funds for GLAAD's efforts to support LGBT youth. The fourth annual event in 2022 raised $400,000.

Tranter is also a supporter of Mercy for Animals and stopped eating meat in 1994.

On November 17, 2019, Tranter was honored with the ACLU of Southern California's Bill of Rights Award for their activist work as "an outspoken and powerful voice for the LGBTQIA+ community, diversity, the climate crisis, arts education, animal rights, and ending gun violence".

Personal life
Tranter is bisexual, gender nonconforming, and non-binary. They have stated that, with regard to pronouns, "they/them/theirs is what I relate to the most".

Other ventures
Tranter's jewelry company, Fetty, grew out of necklaces they designed to sell as merchandise for the Semi Precious Weapons shows. Fetty sold at retailers such as Urban Outfitters and Barneys. The designs typically feature hearts and weapons. In 2008, Tranter designed a limited-edition sneaker for DKNY.

Tranter is the founder and CEO of Facet Records and Publishing, which looks after a roster of artists, songwriters, and producers.

Television and film appearances
Tranter has appeared as a guest on the E! cable network show Chelsea Lately. In December 2008, they also appeared as a coach on the MTV reality show Made, in which they helped a young girl transform into a "rock star". In 2010, Tranter had a cameo appearance as a person at a diner in the music video for "Telephone" by Lady Gaga. In 2012, they were interviewed for the documentary feature film Jobriath A.D. about rock musician Jobriath.

Awards and nominations

Discography

Solo
 Scratched (2002)
 Tear Me Together (2004)

Semi Precious Weapons

 We Love You (2008)
 You Love You (2010)
 Aviation (2014)

Featured appearances

Soundtrack appearances

References

External links

1980 births
21st-century American singers
American jewelry designers
American rock songwriters
American rock singers
Berklee College of Music alumni
Bisexual singers
Bisexual songwriters
Bisexual non-binary people
LGBT people from New York (state)
LGBT people from Illinois
American LGBT singers
American LGBT songwriters
Living people
Non-binary singers
Non-binary songwriters
People from Lake Zurich, Illinois
Semi Precious Weapons members
Singers from New York City
Singer-songwriters from New York (state)
American non-binary writers
American bisexual writers